Old Faithful is a 1935 British drama film directed by Maclean Rogers and starring Horace Hodges, Glennis Lorimer and Bruce Lester. The screenplay concerns an elderly taxi driver who refuses to give up his old horse, even though his business is being taken by younger drivers using modern cars. His anguish is increased when his daughter plans to marry one of the younger taxi drivers.

Cast
 Horace Hodges - Bill Brunning 
 Glennis Lorimer - Lucy Brunning 
 Bruce Lester - Alf Haines 
 Wally Patch - Joe Riley 
 Isobel Scaife - Lily 
 Muriel George - Martha Brown 
 Edward Cooper - Edwards 
 William Hartnell - Minor role

Critical reception
Allmovie called it a "charming comedy"; and TV Guide wrote, "Though dated, this retains some moments of charm, thanks to Hodges' wonderful characterization."

References

External links

1935 films
1935 drama films
Films directed by Maclean Rogers
British drama films
British black-and-white films
1930s English-language films
1930s British films
English-language drama films